Francesco IV Ordelaffi (1435–1466), also known as Cecco IV, was  lord of Forlì from 1448 until his death. He was a member of the Ordelaffi family.

The son of Antonio I Ordelaffi, he succeeded him at Forlì in 1448, under the regency of his mother Caterina Rangoni and, after her death the following year, of her brother Ugo Rangoni. The latter was expelled in 1454 and thenceforth Francesco reigned jointly with his brother Pino III Ordelaffi until his death.

Ordelaffi, Francesco 4
Ordelaffi, Francesco 4
Francesco 4
15th-century Italian nobility
Lords of Forlì